Lingnan culture, or Cantonese culture, refers to the regional Chinese culture of the region of Lingnan: twin provinces of Guangdong and Guangxi, the names of which mean "eastern expanse" and "western expanse" respectively.

Strictly speaking, the term "Lingnan culture" has two definitions:

In a purely geographical sense, the term includes not only Cantonese culture but also the cultures of the Hakkas, Teochews, Taishanese, Hainanese and non-Han groups such as the Zhuangs, Tanka or She within the Lingnan region.
More typically, is only used in referring to Cantonese culture, the historically dominant culturo-linguistic force in Guangdong and Guangxi.

This article uses the second definition of "Lingnan culture" – as the synonym of "Cantonese culture".

With the migration of the Cantonese people to nearby Hong Kong and Macau, as well as in many overseas communities, Lingnan/Cantonese culture has become an influential cultural force in the international community, and forms the basis of the cultures of Hong Kong and Macau. English words of Chinese borrowed many terms from Cantonese.

Brief history and overview

From Nanyue to Sinicization

In 200 BCE, Gwongdung and Gwongsai (Cantonese for "Guangdong" and "Guangxi"), alongside the land now known as Northern Vietnam, was controlled by the kingdom of Nanyue, inhabited primarily by the non-Chinese Yue people. The kingdom was later conquered by the Han Empire and came under Han Chinese control at around year 100 BCE. However, large-scale sinicization didn't occur until the 6th to 7th century CE, at which point the region was held by the Tang Empire. Later, between the 10th and 13th century, there was a large influx of Han Chinese migrants from the north, which was at that time invaded by the Mongols and a few other non-Han ethnic groups. This resulted in large-scale intermixing of the Han Chinese and Nanyue people during that period – reflected in the fact that modern Cantonese people are, genetically, hybrid descendants of the ancient Han Chinese and Nanyue cultures. Modern Lingnan (descendents of Northern Nanyue) contains both Nanyue and Han Chinese elements: modern Cantonese has kept some features of Middle Chinese pronunciation (the prestige language of the Tang Empire), but has also retained a substantial amount of features from the long-extinct Nanyue language.

Sinicization was still ongoing during the Tang and Northern Song dynasties, evidenced by many famous Northern Chinese poets and writers describing the region as "barbaric" and the language spoken in the region as unintelligible with the prestige language commonly spoken in the North. Famous Chinese writer Han Yu described the local population as "小吏十馀家,皆鸟言夷面", which literally means "[speaking] a bird language and [having] barbarian faces". Another writer Liu Zong Yuan describes the local language as "楚越间声音特异，鴃舌啅譟", which literally means that the language sounds strange and is unintelligible with common language from the North. This shows that sinicization was still ongoing and Bai Yue local tribes were still prevalent during the region. The large scale of sinicization of the Lingnan region was largely complete by the time of late Southern Song dynasty (12th to 13th centuries). From the 15th to 18th century, Lingnan (especially the area around Guangzhou) served as one of the main ports for the Ming Empire. Cantonese people were exposed to Western European cultures and incorporated European elements into their own cultural artifacts. It was by that time that the Lingnan culture largely attained its current form.

From 19th century onward
With Guangzhou being major a port for both the Qing dynasty and the People's Republic of China, Cantonese people have often dominated Han Chinese immigration to the Western world, resulting in Cantonese historically being the lingua franca in most Western Chinatowns. They also helped establish the Chinese term for Chinatown: "Tongyan gaai", pronounced as "Tang ren jie" in Mandarin. This term literally means "Street of the Tang people". This is said to reflect the fact that the sinicization of Lingnan was most prominent during the Tang dynasty, which resulted in the Cantonese people having an especially strong affinity to that dynasty.

On the other hand, since the early 20th century, Hong Kong (pronounced as "Heung Gong" in Cantonese香港 ), then under British colonial control, developed quickly in every aspect. The city's high level of development drew the envy of many people in the Lingnan region. Many of them have been watching the TV dramas and movies produced by Hong Kong, resulting in the city having significant cultural influence in the region. For instance, many Cantonese from mainland China write using Traditional Chinese characters, like the Hong Kongers do. Hong Kong, for its part, has experienced many cultural and economic exchanges with other East Asian nations. This, in turn, made Hong Kong absorb the cultures of Japan, Korea, and to some extent, Taiwan. For instance, Hong Kong Cantonese has many usages and vocabularies borrowed from Japanese.

Overall characteristics
Lingnan culture is considered to be a commercial, oceanic culture that embodies the history of the region: Its foundation consists of a mix of Han Chinese and Nanyue (especially the Tang dynasty's and Song dynasty's) influences, having preserved a considerable amount of Tang-Song cultural heritages not preserved in other branches of modern Han Chinese cultures. Lingnan later became the Ming Empire's main contact point with Western Europeans via commerce, and thus came to include European ideas in its arts and philosophy.

Traditional language

Traditionally, the Lingnan region's sole dominant language is Cantonese, the standard form and prestige dialect of the Yue subgroup of the broader Chinese language family. The vast majority of Lingnan's traditional operas, folk songs, and poetry are all expressed in Cantonese. It can trace its roots all the way back to the ancient Nanyue people: Their language did not belong to the Chinese language family though. However, with the large influx of Han Chinese migrants throughout history, especially during the Tang–Song era between the 10th to 13th centuries, the language slowly sinicized and evolved into modern standard Cantonese.

Cantonese has retained certain features of the Nanyue language. For instance, unlike most other Chinese languages, Cantonese often put an adjective behind the noun it is describing. In Cantonese, the word for "hen" is made up of two words: "雞", meaning "chicken", and "乸", meaning "female (in a non-human sense)", thus resulting in a compound word. 

Cantonese has largely inherited all six syllable codas (韵尾) from Middle Chinese, which makes that most Tang poems will rhyme better if recited in Cantonese. However Cantonese lost all voiced consonants (浊声母) from middle Chinese and its prenuclear glides (介音) have evolved significantly from middle Chinese.

Writing system

In terms of its writing system, Cantonese, traditionally preferred not to write their own language verbatim and instead relied on classical Chinese in most forms of writing. Starting from the 21st century, however, a complete Cantonese writing system has been developed in Hong Kong and Macau that utilizes both, standard Chinese characters and native characters, and become popularized.

Architecture

Classic Lingnan architecture

Lingnan architecture is the characteristic architectural style of the Lingnan region, mostly associated with Cantonese people. It differs significantly from those found in other Han Chinese regions because of factors such as climates and availability of materials, both of which affected by the geographical features of Lingnan. Overall, classical Lingnan architecture tends to (1) use pale colors such as green and white, (2) avoid circular or cylindrical structures, (3) have many open structures like balconies, (4) be decorated with large numbers of relief carvings and sculptures, and (5) be built using materials resistant to moulds and moisture. The last point is obviously related to the hot and humid subtropical climate of Lingnan.

The Chan Clan Temple in Guangzhou is a representative example of classical Lingnan architecture. The temple was built in the late 19th century and served as an academy for Chan families in 72 counties of the Guangdong province. It comprises all sorts of folk architectural and decorative arts and is famous for its "three carvings" (stone, wood and brick carvings), "three sculptures" (ceramic sculpture, clay sculpture, and colorful sculpture), and "one cast" (cast iron). As a result, it is called the best of all the clan buildings in the neighborhood.

Tong lau

Tong lau is a style of architecture prevalent in Lingnan region (as well as in some other areas by the South China Sea) starting from the 19th century. Combining Southern Chinese architectural styles with Western European ones, it is particularly prevalent in regions with more exposure to Western European cultures, such as Guangzhou, Hong Kong and Macau. Tong laus in Lingnan show influence from the classical Lingnan style.

Lingnan garden

Lingnan garden, or Cantonese garden, is the style of garden design native to the Lingnan region. Geographically, Lingnan has very different climate from China's heartland (i.e., Zhongyuan), resulting in the development of a different style in garden-designing. The most frequently cited traits of Lingnan gardens are: (1) they tend to surround their plants and flowers with buildings for provided protection, due to the frequent rainstorms in the region; (2) Lingnan gardens usually use regionally native plant species, such as red cotton flowers, lotuses, orchids and lychee trees; and (3) due to Lingnan being far away from the center of political power (i.e., Zhongyuan), gardens in the region have historically been less stressed by royal standards, resulting in a style that leans more towards the common people, e.g., Lingnan gardens are decorated with a large amount of folk arts, ranging from sculptures to porcelains, and also tend to use smaller and simpler buildings.

Visual arts
The Nanyue people were already making a lot of pottery and sculptures back at the time of their kingdom. After sinicization, the techniques of the people in the region only became even more polished and refined. Nowadays, Cantonese are accomplished craftspeople, known for creating and exporting many fine craft products, including various types of sculptures, embroidery, porcelain, paper cutting, kites, furniture, among many others. They have also produced several schools of fine arts. In some, visual art styles invented primarily by the Cantonese include the following:

Canton ivory carving

Canton ivory woodcarving is another well-known product from Lingnan. With a history of 2000 years, it traditionally uses ivory as raw material to make sculptures, with the Canton-style renowned for being particularly delicate and detailed without being brittle. The Cantonese people have also successfully produced the legendary craft product – Ivory ball.

After the 1980s, however, international ivory trade has been banned. This results in the Cantonese people now trying to find substitute materials – materials that look and feel like but are actually not ivory – in their attempt to pass on this ancient art.

Canton jade carving

Canton jade carving is the Cantonese style of jade carving. It has a history of more than two thousand years – with archaeologists unearthing jade carvings from the remains of the kingdom of Nanyue. After sinicization, the people of Lingnan learned jade carving from Tang Empire's jade wares, and invented the technique of “lau sik” – retaining the colors of the original materials, resulting in jade carvings that are very colourful yet natural. Nowadays, Canton jade carvings are frequently used in Cantonese jewelry and decorations.

Cantonese embroidery

Cantonese embroidery (Jyutping: Jyut6 sau3;) is the Cantonese style of embroidery, with considerable popularity in Lingnan and its own subculture. It could trace its root to at least the 9th century, where the Tang Empire had documented that the people in the area were making embroidery. Cantonese embroidery attained its current form at around the 15th century and has its own set of techniques. Visually, it is known for being colorful and containing multiple images without feeling chaotic. Due to Gwongdung's historical role in trade between the Chinese empire and the outside world, Cantonese embroidery had been sold to many Western European people and become a popular type of items in European aristocrats' collections of oriental crafts.

Teochew woodcarving

Teochew woodcarving (Jyutping: Ciu4 zau1 muk6 diu1; Traditional Chinese: 潮州木雕) is a distinctive style of woodcarving that originated from the city of Teochew, which is geographically a part of Lingnan but inhabited primarily by the Teochew people, who belong to the non-Cantonese Min branch of Han Chinese. Despite this, this style of woodcarving is heavily incorporated into various forms of Cantonese crafts. It began in the 11th century and became popularized in the late 16th century. Many Teochew woodcarving products are plated with gold, commonly seen being decorations for Buddhist temples or ancestral halls.

Lingnan penjing

Lingnan penjing (Jyutping: Ling5 naam5 pun4 ging2; Traditional Chinese: 嶺南盆景) is the style of penjing of the people of Lingnan. Despite being recognized only in the early 20th century, it can trace its roots to at least 15th century. This style is noted for its emphasis on the match between "the natural" and "the artificial" parts of the penjing. For instance, artists of Lingnan penjing tend to spend much time choosing a pot that matches those plants. They also tend to trim their plants in such a way that the new growth from the trimmed parts will shadow the trails of trimming, resulting in the penjing looking very natural.

Lingnan style of calligraphy
Lingnan style of calligraphy (Jyutping: Ling5 naam5 syu1 fung1; Traditional Chinese: 嶺南書風) is the style of calligraphy unique to Lingnan. It is typically described by Han Chinese critics as "bold" and "romantic". Archaeological evidence suggests that the people of Lingnan had been writing and producing calligraphy works since the collapse of the kingdom of Nanyue. However, due to the hot and humid climate of Lingnan, papers tend to decay very quickly, resulting in few such works having been preserved. It was not until the 15th century, where Chan Bak-sa (Jyutping: Can4 baak6 saa1; Traditional Chinese: 陳白沙), became the first renowned Cantonese calligrapher that the Lingnan region got a recognized style of calligraphy. Since then, Cantonese artists have produced several notable works of calligraphy, such as:
《袁崇煥督遼餞別圖詩》, literally "The picture poem of farewell to Yun Sung-wun"; It is the work of Kwong Lou, a Cantonese calligrapher from the early 16th century; This work was made in his farewell to his good friend Yun Sung-wun, who had to leave Lingnan due to an assignment from the then Ming emperor. It is a work of "poem painting" (painting with a poem written on it; with both the picture and the poem having some sort of relations to each other). This work is now stored in Hong Kong.
《南園諸子送黎美周北上詩卷》, literally "The picture of various Southern gentlemen coming to say farewell"; It is the work of Zeung Kiu, a Cantonese young woman from the early 16th century, well-known for being both beautiful and very talented. Despite this, she died of an illness at the young age of 19 and her death was widely mourned as a great loss. This work of poem painting is one of her few works and now on show at the Gwongzau Art Gallery.

In the 21st century, the Cantonese people have begun to study the Lingnan style of calligraphy in greater depth.

Canton porcelain

Canton porcelain (Jyutping: Gwong2 coi2; Traditional Chinese: 廣彩, literally "Cantonese colours"), also called Cantonese porcelain, is the Cantonese style of porcelain. It involves painting various colors on white porcelains and cementing the colors on the porcelain products afterward through the use of low heat (less than 800 degree Celsius, which is low by porcelain standard). This style is renowned for its bright colors and detailed drawings. It originated in the 16th century. At that time, the Cantonese people in Guangzhou imported white porcelains from Jingdezhen (a city well known for making white porcelains), worked on them to produce colorful porcelains, and exported their products to Western Europe. Later, this art spread to the entire Lingnan region. Hong Kong, for instance, started making Canton porcelain starting from the 1930s and exported many of their products to the entire world, though nowadays, few Hongkongese work on this style of porcelain outside hobbyists, due to the fact that the city has shifted its focus to service and finance industries.
Gallery

Cantonese furniture

Cantonese furniture (Jyutping: Gwong2 sik1 gaa1 si1; Traditional Chinese: 廣式傢俬) is the Cantonese style of furniture. It can be dated at least back to the 17th century. This style generally uses the native timbers in the Lingnan region, while borrowing elements from traditional furniture styles of the Tang Empire and the Song Empire and artistic styles imported from Western Europe. It is characterized by (1) its tendency to make each furniture item by working on one larger piece of wood, resulting in Cantonese furniture not showing traces of being assembled; (2) taking elements from Baroque and Rococo style, especially in its use of curves; (3) using techniques from other Lingnan crafts, such as Teochew woodcarving; and (4) heavy use of shells and marbles as decorations. Nowadays, Cantonese furniture is being exported to many other Han Chinese communities and to foreign countries.

Lingnan school of painting

Lingnan school of painting (Jyutping: Ling5 naam5 waa2 paai3; Traditional Chinese: 嶺南畫派), also called Cantonese school of painting, is a distinctive style of painting invented primarily by Cantonese artists. It originated in the 19th century, founded by Gou Gim-fu (a Cantonese) and several of his associates. This style combined the ink wash painting shared by all Han Chinese and watercolor painting, also with the influence from impressionism. It emphasizes leaving blank spaces and the use of bright colors, in stark contrast to less colorful ink wash painting. For example, "The Flames of the Eastern Battlefield" used watercolor to paint bright red colors in the background. This, alongside the blank spaces in the painting, gives potential alternative interpretations of the blank spaces, which could look like either smoke or clouds.

Others
Sekwan ware and Cochin ware are types of pottery with Cantonese origins. The former is still being produced by Cantonese, while the latter is more associated with Taiwan these days.

Performing arts

Cantonese people are involved in several types of operas and performing arts, including Tea-picking opera and Han opera, with Cantonese opera being the most prominent one. They also have many types of traditional music. All of these are primarily sung and expressed using the Cantonese language.

Folk songs
The Cantonese language has a very rich collection of folk songs, many of which can be traced back to the ancient Nanyue people before sinicization of the region. These folk songs are widely sung and broadcast in the Lingnan region even to this day. Broadly speaking, they can be divided into several categories:
 "Saltwater songs" (Jyutping: Haam4 seoi2 go1; Traditional Chinese: 鹹水歌), which are popular around the Pearl River Delta, like this one;
 "Rooster-selling rhythms" (Jyutping: Maai6 gai1 diu6; Traditional Chinese: 賣雞調), which are traditionally sung in rooster-worshiping rituals and said to be related to the bird-worshiping totems of Baiyue peoples; An example would be this;
 "Kerria songs" (Jyutping: Gou1 tong4 go1; Traditional Chinese: 高棠歌), which are often sung in weddings;
 "North Canton folk songs" (Jyutping: Jyut6 bak1 man4 go1; Traditional Chinese: 粵北民歌), popular in northern Gwongdung;
 "Cantonese rhymes" (Jyutping: Jyut6 diu1; Traditional Chinese: 粵調), which consists of various subtypes based on pitches and rhythms and include the nam yum tradition. An example of Cantonese rhythms is this .

Cantonese opera

Cantonese opera (Jyutping: Daai6 hei3; Traditional Chinese: 大戲, literally "great drama") is the style of opera associated with the Cantonese language and has been listed as one of intangible cultural heritage of the world. Originated in the late 13th century, Cantonese opera is a stage art that combines acrobatics, singing, martial arts, and acting.

Cantonese opera also uses a different set of musical instruments. Some of these are used also in other oriental opera styles, such as Guzheng (Jyutping: Gu2 zaang1; Traditional Chinese: 古箏). Due to influence from Western opera, Cantonese opera has also started adopting European instruments starting from the 19th century, such as violin. Cantonese opera is also noted for its use of makeup and headdresses on the actors' parts. Makeups in Cantonese opera are primarily white, and could vary in colors depending on the personalities of the characters, e.g., totally white makeups are often used to represent a villain. Headdresses are also used to represent the characters.

Gonggu

Gonggu (Jyutping: Gong2 gu2; Traditional Chinese: 講古, literally "to talk about the past") is a popular folk art in Lingnan. It involves artists telling stories from Chinese classics or Cantonese folklore using the Cantonese language – while borrowing techniques from Cantonese opera in order to be very rhythmic at that. This art form originated in the 16th century, when Cantonese imported it from Jiangsu and several Cantonese artists learnt from the then famous Wuyue storytellers. Since that time, Cantonese Gonggu has seen steady development, with storytellers performing in their own stalls or Cantonese teahouses. Starting from the 20th century, the area around Gwongzau has even started erecting "storytelling stages" (Jyutping: Syut3 syu1 toi4; Traditional Chinese: 說書台, literally "stages where one talks about books") in certain parks and inviting artists to do Gonggu on radio shows.

Partly as a result of this, Cantonese people have accumulated a considerable amount of folktales.

Guangdong music

Guangdong music (Jyutping: Gwong2 dung1 jam1 ok6; Traditional Chinese: 廣東音樂) is a style of traditional Chinese instrumental music from Gwongzau and nearby areas, though nowadays it is found also in much of China. Guangdong music compositions are primarily based on tunes derived from Cantonese opera and Cantonese folk songs, especially before the 1920s. Stylistically, it is said to be marked by being loud, lively, and upbeat. Some pieces have seen influences from Western music (jazz in particular): they use syncopation and triple time, and incorporate instruments such as saxophone and violin.

Musical instruments

The set of musical instruments used in Cantonese opera styles and music has much overlapping with those used by other Han Chinese groups. There are, however, instruments distinctly Cantonese, with the gaohu (gou wu) being the most representative. Aside from this, qinqin (cheon kum) and erxian (yi yun) are other musical instruments associated with Cantonese music.

Pop

Canto-pop, also called HK-pop (Jyutping: Jyut6 jyu5 lau4 hang4 kuk1; Traditional Chinese: 粵語流行曲), is a genre of Cantonese music made primarily in Hong Kong. It is a pop subgenre, with influences from jazz, rock and roll, R&B, electronic music, dance music and others. It is almost invariably sung in Cantonese, boasting an international fanbase across Gwongdung, Gwongsai, Southeast Asia and (to a lesser extent) Korea and Japan.

Cinema

Hong Kong cinema (Jyutping: Gong2 caan2 pin3; Traditional Chinese: 港產片) is the cinema of Hong Kong. For a long time, it had been one of the largest movie industries in the world and still has influence to this day. Being produced by Hong Kong, these movies have been primarily expressed using Cantonese, although films from certain period were in Mandarin due to geopolitical reasons. Their genres may vary, although comedy and martial arts movies are particularly prominent. This style of cinema has a cult following in the West.

Literature

Poetry

The Cantonese language, with its 1000-year-long history, has a rich heritage of poetry and literature. The people of the Lingnan region have been composing poems since the 7th century. Zeung Gau-ling (Jyutping: Zoeng1 gau2 ling4; Traditional Chinese: 張九齡), one of the most prolific poets of the Tang Empire, was born and raised in what is now Siugwan, Guangdong. He was said to be very intelligent since he was a child, and later became the empire's minister. 12 of his poems were listed as the 300 best poems from the Tang Empire. Since then, the Lingnan region has produced a steady stream of poets of varying levels of prominence. They were even given a label called Lingnan school of poetry (Jyutping: Ling5 naam4 si1 paai3; Traditional Chinese: 嶺南詩派), renowned for preserving pronunciations from the Middle Chinese language and composing poems with imagery unique to Lingnan.

Like much of East Asia, most of Lingnan's medieval literature was composed in classical Chinese (grammatically), rather than the people's spoken language. However, poets in the region have started composing poems using grammatically vernacular Cantonese since the 19th century, with the work of Cantonese poet Liu Yan-tou (Jyutping: Liu6 jan1 tou4; Traditional Chinese: 廖恩燾) being the most prominent. Many of his works require Cantonese characters (characters specifically invented to write Cantonese) to write down.

This particular style of poetry has accumulated a large number of works. Starting from the early 21st century, Cantonese people have started compiling works of past Cantonese poets in a literature called "All Cantonese Poems" (Jyutping: Cyun4 jyut6 si1; Traditional Chinese: 全粵詩), which has spanned 30 volumes and yet to be finished.

Vernacular Cantonese literature
Like the rest of East Asia, Lingnan traditionally used classical Chinese for writing, rather than the peoples' spoken languages. Despite the attempt to create vernacular forms of writing in the late 19th century, the Greater China area still tend to use standard written Chinese, a writing system based on Mandarin, not Cantonese (i.e., the native language of the Lingnan region), in writing. Even in cosmopolitan Hong Kong, the vast majority of the people's works of literature have been written in standard written Chinese. However, starting from the 21st century, Hong Kong, as a cultural center in the region, has developed a complete writing system for Cantonese. Some writers in the city now advocate composing literature in written Cantonese.

Food culture
The Lingnan region has a special geographical environment different from those of other Han Chinese regions. With its subtropical temperature and high humidity, it has a tendency to have good harvests whether in farming or fishing. As a result, cuisine in Lingnan could use many different food materials. The book "New Comments on Gwongdung" (廣東新語), written by Wat Dai-gwan, said: 天下所有食貨，粵東幾盡有之，粵東所有之食貨，天下未必盡也。(Classical Chinese: Every ingredient that the world has, Gwongdung has it; Every ingredient that Gwongdung has, the rest of the world may not have it). Today, the cuisine of the Lingnan region has fully developed into a distinct school of cuisine on its own.

Cantonese cuisine

Cantonese cuisine (Jyutping: Jyut6 coi3; Traditional Chinese: 粵菜) is the cuisine corresponding to Cantonese culture. Gwongzau, the cultural capital of the region, has long been a trading hub. This resulted in many imported ingredients are used in Cantonese cuisine. Besides pork, beef, and chicken, Cantonese cuisine uses nearly every edible meat, including offal, chicken feet, duck's tongue, snakes, and snails. However, lamb and goat are rare. There is also heavy use of seafood, due to proximity to the sea. This style of cuisine uses many cooking methods, with steaming and stir-frying being the most popular, largely due to relative convenience.

Traditionally, Cantonese cooks prefer their dishes to have well-balanced flavor and not be greasy. Spices are used in modest amounts at best to preserve the flavors of the primary ingredients, which in turn are expected to be at the peak of their freshness and quality. Cantonese cooking tends not to use fresh herbs, contrary to Sichuan, European, Thai and Vietnamese cuisines, with garlic chives and coriander leaves being the notable exceptions. Lastly, due to the hot and humid weather of Lingnan and the traditional beliefs that soups can "remove hotness" (Jyutping: Cing1 jit6 hei3; Traditional Chinese: 清熱氣), Cantonese cuisine tends to have liberal use of soups.

Lou fo tong

 (Jyutping: Lou5 fo2 tong1; Traditional Chinese: 老火湯, literally "old fire soup") is a cuisine among common people in Lingnan. It refers to a set of clear broth made by simmering meat and other ingredients over low heat for several hours. These ingredients may include meats, vegetables, seafood, fruits, and medicinal herbs. It originated in the late 17th to early 18th century. At that time, Guangdong had difficulty extracting coals, which resulted in Cantonese people having to rely on firewood for fuels. This caused them to avoid using large fire (which cooking techniques such as stir-frying require) and instead use low heat to simmer their foods – resulting in lou fo tong. Nowadays, lou fo tong has been a fully developed style of soups and become an integral part of Cantonese cuisine.
Dishes in Cantonese cuisine

Tea culture

Yum cha (Jyutping: Jam2 caa4; Traditional Chinese: 飲茶, literally "to drink tea") is a subculture within Cantonese food culture. While it can be found in some other Han Chinese groups, it is far more prevalent among Cantonese people, and also overseas Chinese, historically most of whom have been of Cantonese ancestry. It has a specific set of terminologies among Cantonese. For instance, "to invite someone to go yum cha" is basically a way of expressing friendship. Traditionally, Cantonese could go yum cha whether in the morning, afternoon, or evening. Morning tea is typically dominated by the elderly, although many younger people often accompany their grandparents for morning tea as a way of showing respect and affection. Cantonese teahouses also have a set of food specifically designed for morning tea. Afternoon tea is similar in most aspects, except it is more common for entire families to go yum cha at this hour. Evening tea tends to attract large gatherings – and the foods ordered in such hours also tend to be more sophisticated.

Regardless of hours, yum cha starts with the diners ordering a specific set of teas they would like to drink. After that, the waiters would bring the teas, which the diners will be drinking while enjoying the foods and engaging in all sorts of social interactions. Even after they have finished the foods, the diners still tend to stay for half an hour or so chatting.

Dim sum

Dim sum (Jyutping: Dim2 sam1; Traditional Chinese: 點心, literally "to touch the heart") is a characteristic of Cantonese cuisine, usually but not only eaten during yum cha. They are a set of small bite-sized portions of food served in small steam baskets or on small plates. In Cantonese teahouses, carts with dim sum will be moving around the restaurant for the diners to order from without having to leave their seats. In Cantonese traditions, the diners will often order dim sum at will while chatting and enjoying the endless serving of teas.

In major cities in Lingnan, such as Gwongzau and Hong Kong, culinary schools usually offer courses specifically to train the preparation of dim sum.

Leung cha

Leung cha (Jyutping: Leong4 caa4; Traditional Chinese: 涼茶, literally "cool tea") is a kind of infusion made from traditional medicinal herbs. In traditional Chinese medicine, leung cha is used to treat shanghuo and is considered to have a cooling effect on the body. Herbal tea was a unique drink in Lingnan. It is said that herbal tea has appeared before the Qing dynasty. Lingnan is located in a subtropical zone in which the climate is characterized by hot and humid summers and mild winters. People living in subtropical environments are more likely to suffer from ailments such as skin diseases and gastroenteritis, which herbal teas such as leung cha are thought to treat. Drinking herbal tea gradually became widespread as a custom in China, as well as the rest of East Asia. In major cities such as Guangzhou and Hong Kong, "cool tea shops" which specialize in selling herb teas are common sights. Due to the efforts of the governments of Guangdong Province, Hong Kong, and Macau, methods to make leung cha have been considered an intangible cultural heritage practice in China since 2006.

Tong sui

Tong sui (Jyutping: Tong4 seoi2; Traditional Chinese: 糖水, literally "sugar water") is a characteristic dessert of Cantonese cuisine. It is a set of sweet, warm soups or custards served as dessert at the end of a meal in Cantonese traditions. It is also common for Cantonese people to leave home to get some tong sui with a group of friends or family late in the evening, an activity they call "siu yeh" (Jyutping: Siu1 je6; Traditional Chinese: 消夜, pinyin : Shaoye .,literally to "kill the night"). Choices of types of tong sui vary depending on the season: hot black sesame soup, for instance, tends to be favored in winter.

Brewery
Lingnan is also known for producing some notable liquors, mostly of the rice wine variety. The brewery culture of Lingnan can be traced all the way back to the kingdom of Nanyue, who apparently possessed containers of liquors. In the late 11th century, Sou Sik (Jyutping: Sou1 sik1; Traditional Chinese: 蘇軾), one of the prominent poets and then minister of the Song Empire, got demoted and reassigned to Lingnan. Also well known for his love for cuisine, Sou Sik wrote a book on brewery not long after his reassignment to Lingnan, called "Sou Sik's Words on Liquors" (Jyutping: Dung1 bo1 zau2 ging1; Traditional Chinese: 東坡酒經), which became Lingnan's first book on brewery.

Rice wine can be consumed directly, or can be used as a cooking ingredient .

Nowadays, rice wines produced in Lingnan are sold across China and other Asian countries, with Yuk Bing Siu (Jyutping: Juk6 bing1 siu1; Traditional Chinese: 玉冰燒, literally "Jade, ice, and burn"), one of the "Ten Great Liquors of Gwongdung", being particularly renowned.

Fruits
"The Four Great Fruits of Lingnan" (Jyutping: Ling5 naam4 sei3 daai6 ming4 gwo2; Traditional Chinese: 嶺南四大名果) are four fruits locally planted in Lingnan and frequently used in Cantonese cuisine and desserts. They are lychee, banana, pineapple and papaya.

Gallery

Martial arts

Cantonese people also have their own schools of kung fu. Originally disorganized, the fighting techniques of Cantonese people were grouped into different schools between 18th to 19th century. At that time, pirates and bandits were rampant in the empire's fringe regions such as Lingnan. This resulted in Cantonese starting to want to protect themselves, and thus the proliferation of martial arts learning. It was when the Cantonese people organized their fighting techniques into schools, forming the martial arts schools seen among Cantonese today. Martial arts folk heroes from that period, such as Wong Fei-hung, are now popular topics of Cantonese films.

Overall, Cantonese martial arts are known for emphasis on striking in various different ways using punches while remaining a steady lower body posture. They often shout battle cries (for the purpose of unnerving the opponents), rarely jump, kick or do any elaborated large movements – a very pragmatic style focused on striking. Kung fu schools invented and primarily practiced by Cantonese people include, but are not limited to:

Gwongdung schools
Chow Gar
Choy gar
Choy Li Fut
Hung Ga
Mok Gar
Wing Chun

Philosophy

Lingnan also has her own schools of Confucianism. Since the 12th century, there has been a steady stream of Cantonese Neo-Confucian thinkers, resulting in several schools of thoughts.

Lingnan scholarly school
Lingnan scholarly school (Jyutping: Ling5 naam4 hok6 paai3; Traditional Chinese: 嶺南學派) is the most prominent of schools of Neo-Confucian thoughts in Lingnan. It was started by a group of Cantonese Confucian scholars in the 15th century, led by Chan Bak-sa. Chan's writings have now been compiled in a document titled "Chan Bak-sa's Collection" (Jyutping: Can4 hin3 zoeng1 zaap6; Traditional Chinese: 陳獻章集). In this series of writings, Chan expressed his opinions of Confucius's thoughts and reinterpreted them through the lens of Mahayana Buddhism and Taoism. His style of thoughts has a strong theme of humanism and individualism. It also appeared to have been influenced by Western style of thoughts in its belief in more rational ways of thinking than older Confucian thoughts.

Traditional celebrations

Cantonese people also have a distinct set of traditional celebrations. Many of these celebrations are shared by other Han Chinese groups and even other East Asians. The Ghost Festival, for instance, is observed by Japanese and many Southeast Asians as well. However, Cantonese often have their own unique customs. For instance, New Year flower fairs are seen only among Cantonese and certain overseas Chinese communities of Cantonese ancestry. The Lingnan region also has certain celebrations unique to her.

Cantonese New Year customs
New Year flower market
Cantonese lion dance
Nin Lai

Han Chinese celebrations
Lunar New Year
First Full Moon Festival 
Buddha's Birthday
Qingming Festival
Dragon Boat Festival
Birthday of Guanyin
Ghost Festival 
Mid-Autumn Festival 
Double Ninth Festival

Cantonese-specific celebrations
Gwongdung Festival of Joy (Jyutping: Gwong2 dung1 fun1 lok6 zit3; Traditional Chinese: 廣東歡樂節);
Cantonese Temple Fair (Jyutping: Gwong2 fu2 miu2 wui6; Traditional Chinese: 廣府廟會);
Futsan Autumn (Jyutping: Fat2 saan1 cau1 sik6; Traditional Chinese: 佛山秋色);
Self-selling Festival (Jyutping: Maai6 san1 zit3; Traditional Chinese: 賣身節);
Canton Lotus Festival (Jyutping: Joeng4 sing5 ho4 faa1 zit3; Traditional Chinese: 羊城荷花節);
Kite Festival (Jyutping: Fung1 zang1 zit3; Traditional Chinese: 風箏節);
Flying Colors Parade (Jyutping: Piu1 sik1 ceon4 jau4; Traditional Chinese: 飄色巡遊);

Birthdays of local deities
Birthday of Hung Shing (1st and 15th day of any lunar month)
Birthday of Mazu (23rd day of the 3rd lunar month)
Birthday of Yun-mou (3rd day of the 3rd lunar month)
Birthday of Tam Kung (8th day of the 4th month)
Birthday of Lady Sin (24th day of the 11th lunar month)

Religions
Traditionally, the Lingnan region is dominated by two religions – Mahayana Buddhism and Taoism.

Mahayana Buddhism
Compared to worshiping Confucius, Cantonese are traditionally more inclined towards worshiping the Buddha and Bodhisattvas of Mahayana branch of Buddhism, which is shared by most Han Chinese groups. Mahayana Buddhist temples are a common sight in Lingnan, and Buddhist celebrations such as Buddha's Birthday and the Birthday of Guanyin are, traditionally, large events in the region.

The Wan-mun sect of Mahayana Buddhism originated in Lingnan and once spread across much of China during the Northern Song dynasty (10th to 12th century).

Taoism
All Han Chinese groups traditionally adhere to some forms of Taoism, and Cantonese is no exception. Cantonese has a distinct set of Taoist deities. Cantonese people are, traditionally, worshipers of Wong Tai Sin, a Taoist god of healing. They are also strongly inclined to worship sea deities such as Hung Shing and Mazu – reflecting the Cantonese tradition of doing trades overseas.

Culture of distance from Confucius
It has been noted that Cantonese culture is traditionally marked by a "culture of distance from Confucius" (Jyutping: Jyun5 jyu4 man4 faa3; Traditional Chinese: 遠儒文化, literally "culture of distance from Confucius"), which may be related to Lingnan historically being a fringe region of the Chinese Empire and influence from the Tang dynasty (who placed greater emphasis on Taoism and Buddhism than Confucianism): While Confucian philosophy still has its deep influence on Cantonese culture, Confucius Temples are harder to find in Lingnan than Buddhist or Taoist ones.

Others
Cantonese people have a long tradition of doing commerce with the outside world, including with Western Europeans starting from the 15th century, which resulted in Christianity (mostly the Roman Catholic and Protestant variants) gaining foothold in the region. Earlier than that, Cantonese also did trade with Arabs and Persians, thus the presence of Islam in Lingnan.

Commercial tradition

Cantonese merchants (Jyutping: Jyut6 soeng1; Traditional Chinese: 粵商) are merchants of Cantonese origins. In the past two thousand years, Lingnan (especially the area around Gwongzau) has spent much of the time being the Chinese Empire's main port, resulting in a strong commercial tradition, formation of renowned Cantonese trade organizations such as the Canton Factories, and even Cantonese developing their own business culture: Cantonese merchants are known for being pragmatic, preference for actual profits over fame, and avoidance of political matters and display of wealth. Nowadays, Cantonese people still inherit this commercial culture. Major Lingnan cities such as Gwongzau (Guangzhou), Futsan (Foshan), Shenzhen, and Hong Kong are regional (if not international) commercial centers. Hong Kong, for instance, scored 748 in 2016's Global Financial Centres Index, ranking fourth in the world and just below London and New York city.

Cultural symbols

Red cotton flower

Red cotton flower (Jyutping: Muk6 min4 faa1; Traditional Chinese: 木棉花, literally "wood cotton flower") is a species of flower common in Lingnan, and considered to symbolize Cantonese culture. It was said that in 200 BCE, Ziu To (Jyutping: Ziu6 to4; Traditional Chinese: 趙陀), the king of the Nanyue kingdom, once gave a red cotton tree to the Han Empire to express respect – meaning that at that time, the people of Lingnan already used red cotton flowers to represent their homeland. Nowadays, red cotton flower frequently appears in the poems and songs composed by Cantonese people. The folk song Nam Hoi Chiu, for instance, mentioned "紅綿" (Traditional Chinese for "red cotton flower") to represent Cantonese people and culture. Red cotton flower is currently the official symbol of Gwongzau, the cultural center of Lingnan, and also of Gwongdung and Gwongsai as a whole.

Macau lotus

The lotus is the symbol of Macau. It appears on the flag of Macau after the 1999 handover.

Hong Kong orchid

The Hong Kong orchid is arguably the symbol of Hong Kong. It was discovered in 1880, and identified as a new species in 1908. It became Hong Kong's official symbol in 1965 and appears on the flag of Hong Kong after the 1997 handover. Since Hong Kong produced a large number of films, pop songs, and soap operas to promote Cantonese culture, Hong Kong, and by extension the Hong Kong orchid, is widely held to be the symbol of modern Cantonese culture. Nam Hoi Chiu, for instance, also mentioned "紫荊" (Traditional Chinese for "purple orchid") to symbolize Cantonese people.

The Golden Bauhinia Square has a giant statue of the Hong Kong orchid and is one of the major landmarks of Hong Kong.

Sampan

Sampan is a type of flat-bottom boat frequently seen in the shores of South China Sea, used by Cantonese, Hoklo, and many other Southeast Asian ethnic groups. They are usually three to four meters in length and have small shelters on broad. This makes it possible for fishermen to live on their own sampans. In the major Cantonese cities of Gwongzau, Hong Kong and Macau, it is a common sight to see crowds of sampans docked at their harbours. Thus, the image of sampan-filled harbour is strongly associated with Lingnan. Sampans also regularly show up in films and music videos made by Cantonese.

See also

The Legend of Five Goats, a legend about how Gwongzau, the cultural capital of Cantonese, originated.
Cantonese folktales
Eight Sights of Gwongzau
Cantonese Wikipedia
CCTV Nanhai Studio

Cantonese customs
Bone collecting
Cantonese pre-wedding customs
Cantonese wedding
Villain hitting

Related cultures
Chinese culture
Lingnan culture:
Culture of Hong Kong
Culture of Macau
Bashu culture
Wuyue culture
Hakka culture
Teochew culture
Hokkien culture
Taishanese culture

Others
Liangguang ("Leunggwong" in Cantonese), the collective term for Gwongdung and Gwongsai.
Lingnan
Lingnan University
Stone dogs in the Leizhou Peninsula

References

Cantonese culture